Steven Brown (born 4 April 1986) is an Australian judoka who represented Australia at the 2008 Summer Olympics in Beijing. South Australia's first ever Judo Olympian was defeated by Algeria's Mounir Benamadi in the u/66 kg class. Brown is a former u/66 kg Australian Champion and multiple international medalist.

Brown represented Australia at the World Judo Championships in Paris (2011) and Rio de Janeiro (2013), he was also selected for Tokyo (2010), and Chelyabinsk (2014) but did not compete.

In 2014 Brown represented Australia at the Commonwealth Games in Glasgow, Scotland - the first South Australian to do so.  At the end of this event, Brown announced his retirement from competitive Judo.

He is now the head coach of the South Australian Judo Academy.

He recently won his first professional MMA fight at Diamondback Fighting Championship in October 2016 winning via RNC.

References

External links

 
 
 

1986 births
Living people
Australian male judoka
Australian male mixed martial artists
Mixed martial artists utilizing judo
Olympic judoka of Australia
Judoka at the 2008 Summer Olympics
Commonwealth Games competitors for Australia
Judoka at the 2014 Commonwealth Games
Sportspeople from Adelaide